Gerrit de Wet (1616, Amsterdam? – 1674, Leiden), sometimes called De Wett, Düwett, De Weth, or De Weet, was a Dutch painter.

He was a scholar of Rembrandt, whose manner he imitated; he also painted landscapes, and was accounted a good colourist. From 1643 to 1662 he was active in Haarlem. The Copenhagen Gallery has his painting Jephthah's Daughter.

Notes

References
 

1616 births
1674 deaths
Dutch Golden Age painters
Dutch male painters
Painters from Amsterdam